Escalante may refer to:

People
Amat Escalante (born 1979), Mexican filmmaker
Bernardino de Escalante (born 1537), 16th-century Spanish writer, author of one of the first European books on China
Enrique Escalante (born 1984), Puerto Rican volleyball player
Francis García Escalante, Mexican transvestite who has become a famous actor
Gonzalo Escalante (born 1993), Argentine footballer
Jaime Escalante (1930–2010), Bolivian former mathematics teacher
Joe Escalante (born 1963), American musician
Jorge Volpi (born 1968), Mexican writer
José Escalante (born 1995), Honduran footballer
Silvestre Vélez de Escalante, Spanish padre and explorer in North America

Places

United States
The Escalante, a hotel in Ash Fork, Arizona
Escalante, Utah
Escalante Butte, of Eastern Grand Canyon 
Escalante Desert, Utah
Escalante River, Utah
Grand Staircase–Escalante National Monument, Utah
Escalante National Monument, Utah

Elsewhere
Escalante Department, an administrative district in Argentina
Escalante (El Apagado), a volcano in Chile
Escalante, Negros Occidental, Philippines
Escalante, Cantabria, Spain
Escalante River (Venezuela)
5095 Escalante, an asteroid
Escalante (Martian crater), a crater on Mars

Other uses
Escalante massacre, 1985 in Escalante, Negros Occidental, Philippines
Escalante syndrome or Fragile X Syndrome, a genetic disorder